David Garibaldi may refer to:

 David Garibaldi (musician) (born 1946), American musician, member of the band Tower of Power
 David Garibaldi (artist) (born 1982), American performance artist, known for rapidly creating paintings of rock musicians